Vernon R. Covell was an American engineer.  He was chief engineer of the Allegheny County Public Works Department.

A number of his works are listed on the National Register of Historic Places.

Works include:
Armstrong Tunnel, between Forbes and Second Aves. at S. Tenth St. Pittsburgh, PA (Covell, Vernon R.), NRHP-listed
Liberty Bridge, over the Monongahela River Pittsburgh, PA (Covell, V. R.), NRHP-listed 
McKees Rocks Bridge, LR 76, Spur 2, over Ohio River at Bellevue Bellevue, PA (Covell, V. R.), NRHP-listed
Rachel Carson Bridge, Allegheny River at Ninth St. Pittsburgh, PA (Covell, Vernon R.), NRHP-listed
Andy Warhol Bridge, Allegheny River at Seventh St. Pittsburgh, PA (Covell, Vernon R.), NRHP-listed
Roberto Clemente Bridge, Allegheny River at Sixth St. Pittsburgh, PA (Covell, Vernon R.), NRHP-listed
South Tenth Street Bridge, Monongahela River at S. Tenth St. Pittsburgh, PA (Covell, Vernon R.), NRHP-listed
George Westinghouse Bridge, over the Turtle Creek Valley (Covell, Vernon R.)

His leadership and relative contribution vis-a-vis others in one design project is discussed in a HAER document.

He was author of "The Bridge-Raising Program on the Allegheny River in Allegheny County," an article in the Proceedings of the Engineers' Society of Western Pennsylvania 41 (1925): 83, and author of "Erecting a Self-Anchored Suspension Bridge—Seventh Street Bridge at Pittsburgh," in the Engineering News-Record 97 (1926): 502.

References

American civil engineers
People from Allegheny County, Pennsylvania
Year of death missing
Year of birth missing